The 2001 Pittsburgh Pirates season was the 120th season of the franchise; the 115th in the National League. This was their first season at PNC Park. The Pirates finished sixth and last in the National League Central with a record of 62–100, their first 100 loss season since 1985. The year also saw longtime Pirate Bill Mazeroski inducted into the Hall of Fame.

Offseason
February 1, 2001: Billy Taylor was signed as a free agent with the Pittsburgh Pirates.

Regular season

Season standings

Game log

|- style="background:#fbb;"
| 1 || April 3 || @ Cincinnati || 2–3 || Fernandez || Ritchie || Graves || 20,784 || 0–1
|- style="background:#cfc;"
| 2 || April 4 || @ Cincinnati || 6–5 (10) || Williams || Sullivan || — || 18,330 || 1–1
|- style="background:#fbb;"
| 3 || April 5 || @ Cincinnati || 1–4 || Dessens || Anderson || Riedling || 20,482 || 1–2
|- style="background:#fbb;"
| 4 || April 6 || @ Houston || 1–4 || Dotel || Olivares || Wagner || 27,126 || 1–3
|- style="background:#cfc;"
| 5 || April 7 || @ Houston || 5–3 || Arroyo || Bottenfield || Williams || 30,046 || 2–3
|- style="background:#cfc;"
| 6 || April 8 || @ Houston || 9–3 || Beimel || Elarton || — || 30,174 || 3–3
|- style="background:#fbb;"
| 7 || April 9 || Cincinnati || 2–8 || Reitsma || Ritchie || — || 36,954 || 3–4
|- style="background:#cfc;"
| 8 || April 11 || Cincinnati || 6–5 || Silva || Riedling || Williams || 35,045 || 4–4
|- style="background:#fbb;"
| 9 || April 12 || Cincinnati || 6–11 || Harnisch || Olivares || — || 33,045 || 4–5
|- style="background:#fbb;"
| 10 || April 13 || @ Chicago || 2–4 || Bere || Arroyo || Fassero || 26,003 || 4–6
|- style="background:#fbb;"
| 11 || April 14 || @ Chicago || 6–7 || Aybar || Silva || Fassero || 34,220 || 4–7
|- style="background:#fbb;"
| 12 || April 15 || @ Chicago || 1–5 || Duncan || Sauerbeck || — || 21,061 || 4–8
|- style="background:#cfc;"
| 13 || April 16 || Houston || 3–0 || Anderson || Miller || Williams || 20,128 || 5–8
|- style="background:#cfc;"
| 14 || April 18 || Houston || 8–4 || Arroyo || Reynolds || — || 20,339 || 6–8
|- style="background:#fbb;"
| 15 || April 20 || Chicago || 2–8 || Lieber || Martinez || — || 31,692 || 6–9
|- style="background:#fbb;"
| 16 || April 21 || Chicago || 3–4 || Heredia || Williams || Fassero || 33,105 || 6–10
|- style="background:#cfc;"
| 17 || April 22 || Chicago || 4–3 (10) || Williams || Fassero || — || 35,676 || 7–10
|- style="background:#cfc;"
| 18 || April 24 || @ Los Angeles || 5–1 || Olivares || Park || — || 23,596 || 8–10
|- style="background:#fbb;"
| 19 || April 25 || @ Los Angeles || 5–6 || Adams || Manzanillo || — || 22,495 || 8–11
|- style="background:#fbb;"
| 20 || April 26 || @ Los Angeles || 3–6 || Brown || Ritchie || — || 24,143 || 8–12
|- style="background:#cfc;"
| 21 || April 27 || @ San Diego || 3–0 || Anderson || Jones || Williams || 27,896 || 9–12
|- style="background:#fbb;"
| 22 || April 28 || @ San Diego || 1–8 || Eaton || Arroyo || — || 48,326 || 9–13
|- style="background:#fbb;"
| 23 || April 29 || @ San Diego || 1–6 || Williams || Olivares || Hoffman || 41,654 || 9–14
|-

|- style="background:#fbb;"
| 24 || May 1 || San Francisco || 6–11 || Rueter || Martinez || — || 22,926 || 9–15
|- style="background:#fbb;"
| 25 || May 2 || San Francisco || 6–7 || Ortiz || Silva || Nen || 22,880 || 9–16
|- style="background:#cfc;"
| 26 || May 3 || San Francisco || 4–3 || Silva || Estes || Williams || 23,048 || 10–16
|- style="background:#fbb;"
| 27 || May 4 || Colorado || 3–9 || Hampton || Arroyo || — || 32,653 || 10–17
|- style="background:#cfc;"
| 28 || May 5 || Colorado || 11–3 || Olivares || Chacon || — || 37,596 || 11–17
|- style="background:#cfc;"
| 29 || May 6 || Colorado || 4–3 (11) || Beimel || White || — || 34,915 || 12–17
|- style="background:#fbb;"
| 30 || May 7 || @ St. Louis || 0–7 || Morris || Ritchie || — || 31,891 || 12–18
|- style="background:#fbb;"
| 31 || May 8 || @ St. Louis || 2–8 || Benes || Anderson || — || 35,771 || 12–19
|- style="background:#fbb;"
| 32 || May 9 || @ St. Louis || 2–6 || Hermanson || Arroyo || — || 33,921 || 12–20
|- style="background:#fbb;"
| 33 || May 10 || @ St. Louis || 5–11 || Matthews || Silva || — || 45,008 || 12–21
|- style="background:#cfc;"
| 34 || May 11 || @ Milwaukee || 3–0 || Schmidt || Haynes || Williams || 31,525 || 13–21
|- style="background:#fbb;"
| 35 || May 12 || @ Milwaukee || 4–5 (12) || Leskanic || Beimel || — || 42,004 || 13–22
|- style="background:#fbb;"
| 36 || May 13 || @ Milwaukee || 1–4 || Sheets || Anderson || — || 30,084 || 13–23
|- style="background:#fbb;"
| 37 || May 14 || @ Milwaukee || 8–11 || Wright || Wengert || Leskanic || 26,974 || 13–24
|- style="background:#fbb;"
| 38 || May 15 || St. Louis || 3–8 || Hermanson || Olivares || — || 30,883 || 13–25
|- style="background:#fbb;"
| 39 || May 16 || St. Louis || 0–3 || Kile || Schmidt || — || 29,128 || 13–26
|- style="background:#fbb;"
| 40 || May 17 || St. Louis || 2–12 || Morris || Ritchie || — || 29,835 || 13–27
|- style="background:#cfc;"
| 41 || May 19 || Milwaukee || 6–1 || Anderson || Sheets || — || 37,857 || 14–27
|- style="background:#cfc;"
| 42 || May 20 || Milwaukee || 8–7 || Manzanillo || Weathers || Williams || 35,728 || 15–27
|- style="background:#fbb;"
| 43 || May 23 || @ Philadelphia || 0–4 || Wolf || Schmidt || Bottalico || — || 15–28
|- style="background:#fbb;"
| 44 || May 23 || @ Philadelphia || 2–5 || Daal || Olivares || Mesa || 13,337 || 15–29
|- style="background:#fbb;"
| 45 || May 24 || @ Philadelphia || 5–6 || Cormier || Sauerbeck || Mesa || 12,287 || 15–30
|- style="background:#fbb;"
| 46 || May 25 || @ Atlanta || 0–1 || Maddux || Ritchie || — || 28,120 || 15–31
|- style="background:#fbb;"
| 47 || May 26 || @ Atlanta || 3–9 || Burkett || Wengert || — || 40,788 || 15–32
|- style="background:#cfc;"
| 48 || May 27 || @ Atlanta || 6–3 || Arroyo || Glavine || Williams || 35,728 || 16–32
|- style="background:#cfc;"
| 49 || May 28 || Florida || 8–5 || Silva || Miceli || Williams || 26,512 || 17–32
|- style="background:#fbb;"
| 50 || May 29 || Florida || 0–5 || Burnett || Anderson || — || 21,083 || 17–33
|- style="background:#fbb;"
| 51 || May 30 || Florida || 7–9 (10) || Alfonseca || Williams || Looper || 24,343 || 17–34
|-

|- style="background:#fbb;"
| 52 || June 1 || Atlanta || 1–5 || Burkett || Ritchie || — || 34,230 || 17–35
|- style="background:#fbb;"
| 53 || June 3 || Atlanta || 7–11 || Glavine || Olivares || — || — || 17–36
|- style="background:#fbb;"
| 54 || June 3 || Atlanta || 3–8 || Smoltz || Anderson || — || 36,924 || 17–37
|- style="background:#cfc;"
| 55 || June 5 || @ Florida || 5–2 || Schmidt || Penny || Williams || 10,138 || 18–37
|- style="background:#fbb;"
| 56 || June 6 || @ Florida || 2–7 || Dempster || Ritchie || — || 10,114 || 18–38
|- style="background:#fbb;"
| 57 || June 7 || @ Florida || 3–5 || Bones || Manzanillo || Alfonseca || 14,516 || 18–39
|- style="background:#fbb;"
| 58 || June 8 || @ Minnesota || 6–8 || Carrasco || Olivares || Hawkins || 29,587 || 18–40
|- style="background:#fbb;"
| 59 || June 9 || @ Minnesota || 2–3 || Mays || Anderson || Hawkins || 26,685 || 18–41
|- style="background:#cfc;"
| 60 || June 10 || @ Minnesota || 11–8 || Sauerbeck || Miller || Williams || 24,400 || 19–41
|- style="background:#cfc;"
| 61 || June 12 || @ Detroit || 13–3 || Ritchie || Mlicki || — || 15,919 || 20–41
|- style="background:#fbb;"
| 62 || June 13 || @ Detroit || 3–6 || Weaver || Beimel || Anderson || 17,639 || 20–42
|- style="background:#fbb;"
| 63 || June 14 || @ Detroit || 4–6 || Sparks || Arroyo || Anderson || 17,305 || 20–43
|- style="background:#cfc;"
| 64 || June 15 || Cleveland || 6–3 || Anderson || Burba || Williams || 36,235 || 21–43
|- style="background:#cfc;"
| 65 || June 16 || Cleveland || 6–4 || Schmidt || Wright || Williams || 37,056 || 22–43
|- style="background:#cfc;"
| 66 || June 17 || Cleveland || 1–0 || Ritchie || Karsay || — || 36,694 || 23–43
|- style="background:#cfc;"
| 67 || June 19 || Philadelphia || 8–5 || Beimel || Chen || Sauerbeck || 33,713 || 24–43
|- style="background:#fbb;"
| 68 || June 20 || Philadelphia || 5–9 || Daal || Arroyo || — || 28,145 || 24–44
|- style="background:#fbb;"
| 69 || June 21 || Philadelphia || 3–6 || Person || Anderson || Mesa || 29,560 || 24–45
|- style="background:#fbb;"
| 70 || June 22 || Montréal || 5–11 || Armas || Schmidt || — || 33,439 || 24–46
|- style="background:#cfc;"
| 71 || June 23 || Montréal || 7–4 || Ritchie || Yoshii || Williams || 38,169 || 25–46
|- style="background:#fbb;"
| 72 || June 24 || Montréal || 4–11 || Mattes || Beimel || — || 36,826 || 25–47
|- style="background:#cfc;"
| 73 || June 25 || Milwaukee || 6–4 || Williams || Levrault || Williams || 22,470 || 26–47
|- style="background:#cfc;"
| 74 || June 26 || Milwaukee || 7–6 (12) || Olivares || King || — || 24,120 || 27–47
|- style="background:#cfc;"
| 75 || June 27 || Milwaukee || 6–2 || Schmidt || Haynes || — || 25,756 || 28–47
|- style="background:#cfc;"
| 76 || June 28 || Milwaukee || 1–0 || Ritchie || Wright || Williams || 36,390 || 29–47
|- style="background:#fbb;"
| 77 || June 29 || @ Montréal || 3–12 || Mattes || Beimel || — || 6,504 || 29–48
|- style="background:#fbb;"
| 78 || June 30 || @ Montréal || 6–7 || Lloyd || Williams || — || 8,711 || 29–49
|-

|- style="background:#fbb;"
| 79 || July 1 || @ Montréal || 3–9 || Thurman || Anderson || — || 6,631 || 29–50
|- style="background:#cfc;"
| 80 || July 2 || @ Cincinnati || 10–5 || Schmidt || Davis || — || 22,397 || 30–50
|- style="background:#cfc;"
| 81 || July 3 || @ Cincinnati || 3–2 || Ritchie || Dessens || Williams || 21,724 || 31–50
|- style="background:#cfc;"
| 82 || July 4 || @ Cincinnati || 14–3 || Beimel || Reith || — || 17,972 || 32–50
|- style="background:#fbb;"
| 83 || July 5 || @ Cincinnati || 1–7 || Acevedo || Williams || — || 24,128 || 32–51
|- style="background:#cfc;"
| 84 || July 6 || @ Chicago || 10–6 || Manzanillo || Howry || — || 19,554 || 33–51
|- style="background:#fbb;"
| 85 || July 7 || @ Chicago || 1–4 || Wells || Schmidt || Foulke || 25,113 || 33–52
|- style="background:#fbb;"
| 86 || July 8 || @ Chicago || 2–9 || Lowe || Ritchie || — || 22,105 || 33–53
|- style="background:#cfc;"
| 87 || July 12 || Kansas City || 2–0 || Anderson || Suppan || Williams || 26,393 || 34–53
|- style="background:#cfc;"
| 88 || July 13 || Kansas City || 1–0 || Ritchie || Grimsley || — || 35,325 || 35–53
|- style="background:#fbb;"
| 89 || July 14 || Kansas City || 4–7 || Wilson || Williams || Hernandez || 37,789 || 35–54
|- style="background:#fbb;"
| 90 || July 15 || Los Angeles || 2–4 || Brown || Schmidt || Shaw || 38,152 || 35–55
|- style="background:#fbb;"
| 91 || July 16 || Los Angeles || 4–6 || Gagne || Beimel || Shaw || 26,145 || 35–56
|- style="background:#fbb;"
| 92 || July 17 || Los Angeles || 1–4 || Adams || Anderson || Herges || 30,150 || 35–57
|- style="background:#fbb;"
| 93 || July 18 || Chicago || 5–6 || Fassero || Williams || Gordon || 31,919 || 35–58
|- style="background:#cfc;"
| 94 || July 19 || Chicago || 3–2 || Olivares || Duncan || Williams || 34,921 || 36–58
|- style="background:#cfc;"
| 95 || July 20 || @ St. Louis || 4–1 || Schmidt || Hermanson || Manzanillo || 35,215 || 37–58
|- style="background:#fbb;"
| 96 || July 21 || @ St. Louis || 2–9 || Smith || Beimel || — || 44,930 || 37–59
|- style="background:#cfc;"
| 97 || July 22 || @ St. Louis || 2–0 || Anderson || Timlin || Williams || 33,546 || 38–59
|- style="background:#fbb;"
| 98 || July 24 || @ Chicago || 2–10 || Tavarez || Ritchie || — || 40,269 || 38–60
|- style="background:#fbb;"
| 99 || July 25 || @ Chicago || 5–6 || Lieber || Williams || — || 38,508 || 38–61
|- style="background:#fbb;"
| 100 || July 26 || Houston || 2–3 || Mlicki || Schmidt || Wagner || 30,245 || 38–62
|- style="background:#cfc;"
| 101 || July 27 || Houston || 3–2 || Beimel || Reynolds || Williams || 38,463 || 39–62
|- style="background:#cfc;"
| 102 || July 28 || Houston || 9–8 || Olivares || Wagner || — || 32,977 || 40–62
|- style="background:#fbb;"
| 103 || July 28 || Houston || 3–12 || McKnight || Anderson || — || 38,295 || 40–63
|- style="background:#cfc;"
| 104 || July 29 || Houston || 4–1 || Ritchie || Miller || Williams || 37,166 || 41–63
|- style="background:#fbb;"
| 105 || July 31 || @ San Francisco || 7–8 (11) || Gomes || Wilkins || — || 41,529 || 41–64
|-

|- style="background:#fbb;"
| 106 || August 1 || @ San Francisco || 1–3 || Schmidt || Beimel || Nen || 41,251 || 41–65
|- style="background:#fbb;"
| 107 || August 2 || @ San Francisco || 0–3 || Rueter || McKnight || Nen || 41,726 || 41–66
|- style="background:#fbb;"
| 108 || August 3 || @ Colorado || 7–12 || Hampton || Anderson || — || 38,836 || 41–67
|- style="background:#cfc;"
| 109 || August 4 || @ Colorado || 6–3 || Ritchie || Chacon || — || 44,294 || 42–67
|- style="background:#cfc;"
| 110 || August 5 || @ Colorado || 5–4 || Lincoln || Bohanon || Fetters || 36,570 || 43–67
|- style="background:#fbb;"
| 111 || August 7 || Los Angeles || 1–2 || Adams || McKnight || Shaw || 28,873 || 43–68
|- style="background:#fbb;"
| 112 || August 8 || Los Angeles || 4–9 || Carrara || Anderson || — || 29,528 || 43–69
|- style="background:#cfc;"
| 113 || August 9 || Los Angeles || 8–5 || Ritchie || Park || Fetters || 29,841 || 44–69
|- style="background:#fbb;"
| 114 || August 10 || San Diego || 2–3 || Tollberg || Williams || Hoffman || 36,588 || 44–70
|- style="background:#fbb;"
| 115 || August 11 || San Diego || 2–6 || Lawrence || Beimel || — || 39,388 || 44–71
|- style="background:#cfc;"
| 116 || August 12 || San Diego || 7–6 || Manzanillo || Myers || — || 37,150 || 45–71
|- style="background:#fbb;"
| 117 || August 13 || @ Arizona || 0–3 || Johnson || Anderson || — || 32,386 || 45–72
|- style="background:#fbb;"
| 118 || August 14 || @ Arizona || 3–4 (10) || Batista || Marte || — || 31,006 || 45–73
|- style="background:#fbb;"
| 119 || August 15 || @ Arizona || 2–5 || Schilling || Williams || — || 28,703 || 45–74
|- style="background:#fbb;"
| 120 || August 16 || @ Houston || 3–4 || Miller || Beimel || Wagner || 26,518 || 45–75
|- style="background:#fbb;"
| 121 || August 17 || @ Houston || 5–6 || Mlicki || McKnight || Wagner || 37,363 || 45–76
|- style="background:#fbb;"
| 122 || August 18 || @ Houston || 0–3 || Hernandez || Anderson || Dotel || 41,955 || 45–77
|- style="background:#fbb;"
| 123 || August 19 || @ Houston || 2–12 || Oswalt || Ritchie || — || 35,915 || 45–78
|- style="background:#cfc;"
| 124 || August 21 || Arizona || 4–2 || Olivares || Schilling || Fetters || 35,131 || 46–78
|- style="background:#fbb;"
| 125 || August 22 || Arizona || 0–6 || Lopez || Beimel || — || 26,531 || 46–79
|- style="background:#cfc;"
| 126 || August 23 || Arizona || 5–1 || McKnight || Johnson || Fetters || 30,794 || 47–79
|- style="background:#fbb;"
| 127 || August 24 || Houston || 1–5 || Oswalt || Anderson || — || 37,324 || 47–80
|- style="background:#cfc;"
| 128 || August 25 || Houston || 8–2 || Ritchie || Mlicki || — || 37,665 || 48–80
|- style="background:#fbb;"
| 129 || August 26 || Houston || 1–3 || Villone || Williams || Wagner || 34,850 || 48–81
|- style="background:#fbb;"
| 130 || August 27 || @ Milwaukee || 5–12 || Coppinger || Beimel || Buddie || 26,289 || 48–82
|- style="background:#cfc;"
| 131 || August 28 || @ Milwaukee || 6–5 || Sauerbeck || Leskanic || Fetters || 23,579 || 49–82
|- style="background:#fbb;"
| 132 || August 29 || @ Milwaukee || 8–9 || Levrault || Anderson || Fox || 24,551 || 49–83
|- style="background:#fbb;"
| 133 || August 31 || @ Cincinnati || 3–11 || Reitsma || Ritchie || — || 19,090 || 49–84
|-

|- style="background:#cfc;"
| 134 || September 1 || @ Cincinnati || 7–0 || Williams || Acevedo || — || 24,308 || 50–84
|- style="background:#fbb;"
| 135 || September 2 || @ Cincinnati || 6–8 || Sullivan || Lincoln || Graves || 21,881 || 50–85
|- style="background:#fbb;"
| 136 || September 3 || Milwaukee || 7–12 || Leiter || Vogelsong || — || — || 50–86
|- style="background:#cfc;"
| 137 || September 3 || Milwaukee || 3–2 || Fetters || Fox || — || 29,003 || 51–86
|- style="background:#cfc;"
| 138 || September 4 || Milwaukee || 5–2 || Arroyo || Levrault || Fetters || 17,293 || 52–86
|- style="background:#cfc;"
| 139 || September 5 || Milwaukee || 5–1 || Ritchie || Wright || — || 18,866 || 53–86
|- style="background:#fbb;"
| 140 || September 6 || Cincinnati || 6–8 || Brower || Loiselle || Graves || 20,683 || 53–87
|- style="background:#cfc;"
| 141 || September 7 || Cincinnati || 3–1 || McKnight || Davis || Olivares || 33,800 || 54–87
|- style="background:#cfc;"
| 142 || September 8 || Cincinnati || 5–2 || Anderson || Dessens || — || 38,638 || 55–87
|- style="background:#fbb;"
| 143 || September 9 || Cincinnati || 3–5 || Reyes || Vogelsong || Graves || 33,214 || 55–88
|- style="background:#fbb;"
| 144 || September 17 || New York || 1–4 || Franco || Fetters || Benitez || 25,902 || 55–89
|- style="background:#fbb;"
| 145 || September 18 || New York || 5–7 || Riggan || Olivares || Benitez || 19,285 || 55–90
|- style="background:#fbb;"
| 146 || September 19 || New York || 2–9 || Gonzalez || McKnight || — || 20,371 || 55–91
|- style="background:#fbb;"
| 147 || September 20 || St. Louis || 1–9 || Williams || Anderson || — || 21,678 || 55–92
|- style="background:#fbb;"
| 148 || September 21 || St. Louis || 5–9 || Hackman || Olivares || — || 36,209 || 55–93
|- style="background:#fbb;"
| 149 || September 22 || St. Louis || 1–4 || Smith || Ritchie || Stechschulte || 37,539 || 55–94
|- style="background:#cfc;"
| 150 || September 23 || St. Louis || 2–1 || Williams || Hermanson || Manzanillo || 33,633 || 56–94
|- style="background:#cfc;"
| 151 || September 24 || Chicago || 7–6 || Lincoln || Chiasson || Loiselle || 18,908 || 57–94
|- style="background:#cfc;"
| 152 || September 25 || Chicago || 13–1 || Anderson || Bere || — || 18,581 || 58–94
|- style="background:#fbb;"
| 153 || September 26 || Chicago || 4–8 || Cruz || Arroyo || — || 25,564 || 58–95
|- style="background:#fbb;"
| 154 || September 28 || @ St. Louis || 3–14 || Hermanson || Ritchie || — || 33,218 || 58–96
|- style="background:#fbb;"
| 155 || September 29 || @ St. Louis || 0–2 || Morris || Williams || Stechschulte || 39,782 || 58–97
|- style="background:#fbb;"
| 156 || September 30 || @ St. Louis || 3–7 || Williams || McKnight || — || 42,442 || 58–98
|-

|- style="background:#cfc;"
| 157 || October 1 || @ New York || 5–1 || Anderson || Rusch || Sauerbeck || 6,315 || 59–98
|- style="background:#cfc;"
| 158 || October 2 || @ New York || 10–1 || Arroyo || Chen || — || 8,058 || 60–98
|- style="background:#fbb;"
| 159 || October 3 || @ New York || 0–3 || Trachsel || Ritchie || — || 6,627 || 60–99
|- style="background:#cfc;"
| 160 || October 5 || @ Chicago || 3–2 || Beimel || Bere || Fetters || 24,786 || 61–99
|- style="background:#fbb;"
| 161 || October 6 || @ Chicago || 2–13 || Tavarez || McKnight || — || 35,020 || 61–100
|- style="background:#cfc;"
| 162 || October 7 || @ Chicago || 4–3 || Beimel || Zambrano || Fetters || 35,083 || 62–100
|-

|-
| Legend:       = Win       = LossBold = Pirates team member

Record vs. opponents

Detailed records

Roster

Opening Day lineup

Notable transactions
April 2, 2001: Billy Taylor was released by the Pittsburgh Pirates.
April 3, 2001: Billy Taylor was signed as a free agent with the Pittsburgh Pirates.
April 11, 2001: Ramón Martínez was signed as a free agent with the Pittsburgh Pirates.
June 5, 2001: Jeremy Guthrie was drafted by the Pittsburgh Pirates in the 3rd round of the 2001 amateur draft, but did not sign.
July 30, 2001: John Vander Wal and Jason Schmidt were traded by the Pittsburgh Pirates to the San Francisco Giants for Armando Ríos and Ryan Vogelsong.

PNC Park

The Pirates opened the park with two pre-season games against the New York Mets, the first was played on March 31, 2001. The first official baseball game played in PNC Park was between the Cincinnati Reds and the Pittsburgh Pirates, on April 9, 2001. The Reds won the game by the final score of 8–2. The first pitch was thrown by Todd Ritchie, a ball to Barry Larkin. In the top of the first inning, Sean Casey's two-run home run was the first hit in the park. The first Pirates' batter, Adrian Brown, struck out; however, later in the inning Jason Kendall singled, the first hit by a Pirate. Two days later, John Vander Wal became the first Pirate to hit a home run in the park.

Upon opening in 2001, PNC Park was praised by fans and media alike. Jim Caple, of ESPN.com, ranked PNC Park as the best stadium in Major League Baseball, with a score of 95 out of 100. He compared the park to Fallingwater, calling the stadium itself "perfect", and citing the high ticket prices as the only negative aspect of visiting the park. Pirates' vice-president Steve Greenberg said, "We said when construction began that we would build the best ballpark in baseball, and we believe we've done that." Major League Baseball executive Paul Beeston has said the park was the best he's seen so far in baseball. Many of the workers who built the park said that it was the nicest that they have seen. In 2008, Men's Fitness named the park one of "10 big league parks worth seeing this summer".

Awards and honors

2001 Major League Baseball All-Star Game
Brian Giles, OF, reserve

Statistics
Hitting
Note: G = Games played; AB = At bats; H = Hits; Avg. = Batting average; HR = Home runs; RBI = Runs batted in

Pitching
Note: G = Games pitched; IP = Innings pitched; W = Wins; L = Losses; ERA = Earned run average; SO = Strikeouts

Draft picks

Note
Age at time of draft.

Farm system

LEAGUE CO-CHAMPIONS: Williamsport

References

 2001 Pittsburgh Pirates team page at Baseball Reference
 2001 Pittsburgh Pirates team page at www.baseball-almanac.com

Pittsburgh Pirates seasons
Pittsburgh Pirates Season, 2001
Pittsburgh Pirates Season, 2001
Pittsburgh Pirates